Duke George II of Württemberg-Montbéliard (5 October 1626 in Montbéliard – 1 June 1699 in Montbéliard) was Duke of Württemberg-Montbéliard from 1662 until his death.

Life 
George II was a son of the Duke Louis Frederick of Württemberg-Montbéliard (1586-1631) from his second marriage to Anna Eleanor (1602-1685), daughter of Count John Casimir of Nassau Gleiberg (1577-1602). He succeeded his older brother Leopold Frederick as Duke of Württemberg-Montbéliard in 1662.

Montbéliard was occupied in 1676 by French troops.  King Louis XIV was trying to conquer all Württemberg possessions on the left bank of the Rhine.  George fled the courty.  In 1684, he was given an opportunity to return, under the condition that he recognized the King of France as his liege lord.  He refused, and Württemberg-Montbéliard was administered by his cousin Frederick Charles, Duke of Württemberg-Winnental until 1698.

After Frederick Charles died in 1698, George II returned to Montbéliard, where he died a year later.

Marriage and issue 
George married on 9 March 1648 in Montbeliard with Anne de Coligny (1624-1680), daughter of Gaspard III de Coligny.  With her he had the following children:
 Otto Frederick (1650-1653)
 Henrietta (1654-1680)
 Eleonore Charlotte (1656-1743)
 married in 1672 with Duke Silvius II Frederick of Württemberg-Oels (1651-1697)
 Conrad Louis (1658-1659)
 Anna (1660-1733)
 Elizabeth (1665-1726)
 married in 1689 with Duke Frederick Ferdinand von Württemberg-Weitlingen (1654-1705, grandson of Julius Frederick, Duke of Württemberg-Weiltingen)
 Hedwig (1667-1715)
 Leopold Eberhard (1670-1723), his only surviving son and successor, married:
 in 1695 with Anna Sabine Hedwig, Countess of Sponeck (1676-1735), divorced in 1714
 in 1718 with Charlotte Elizabeth Curie, Baroness of L'Esperance (1684-1733)

References 
 

1626 births
1699 deaths
17th-century dukes of Württemberg
Counts of Montbéliard